A Soul's Tragedy is a play by Robert Browning. It was first printed with Luria as the concluding number of Bells and Pomegranates (No. VIII) in April 1846. It is a tragi‐comedy in two acts: the first in verse, the second in prose.

Persons 

 Luitolfo and Eulalia, betrothed lovers
 Chiappino, their friend
 Ogniben, the Pope's Legate
 Citizens of Faenza

Time, 15—

References

Sources 

 Birch, Dinah, ed. (2009). "Soul's Tragedy, A". In The Oxford Companion to English Literature. 7th ed. Oxford University Press. Retrieved 20 October 2022.
 Drabble, M.; Stringer, J.; Hahn, D., eds. (2007). "Soul's Tragedy, A". In The Concise Oxford Companion to English Literature. 3rd ed. Oxford University Press. Retrieved 20 October 2022.
 Scudder, Horace E. (1895). The Complete Poetic and Dramatic Works of Robert Browning. Boston and New York: Houghton, Mifflin and Co.; Cambridge: The Riverside Press. p. 289.

Plays by Robert Browning
1846 plays